Live! is the first live album by British rock band Status Quo. The double album is an amalgam of performances at Glasgow's Apollo Theatre between 27 and 29 October 1976, recorded using the Rolling Stones Mobile Studio.

Guitarist and singer Francis Rossi described Live! as "the worst album we ever made", continuing, "I always thought we were better than that. Rick Parfitt and I were left to mix it, and we went through the recordings of the three nights we played, only to pick the first one." Parfitt disagreed, saying, "There are bits of the live album that still give me goosebumps."

The album includes a typically extended version of "Forty Five Hundred Times". "The first part of the song was the song, but we'd make the extra bits up…" recalled Parfitt. "You'd just know when to get softer and then take it somewhere heavier. It was incredible. You'd be swept away by this rollercoaster of music. The only way to end it was to nod, 'Shall we finish it here?'"

Various issues
The original album included the full gig minus the crowd singing "You'll Never Walk Alone" before the encore, but swapped around to accommodate the running times of a double vinyl album. The USA release featured a different cover. The 2005 remaster by Tim Turan re-sequenced the concert in gig order. In 2014, a box set was released that included the live album plus two additional bonus discs. For this release (remastered by Andy Pearce), the original packaging was adapted to the CD format, and the tracklisting went back to the original vinyl order. The unreleased disc 4 "Australia '74" re-used the artwork of the US "Live!" release.

Track listing
Side one
 "Intro/Junior's Wailing" (Kieran White, Martin Pugh), 5:16
 "Backwater/Just Take Me" (Rick Parfitt, Alan Lancaster), 7:39
 "Is There a Better Way" (Francis Rossi, Lancaster), 4:30
 "In My Chair" (Rossi, Bob Young), 4:00
Side two
 "Little Lady/Most of the Time" (Parfitt/Rossi, Young), 7:00
 "Forty Five Hundred Times" (Rossi, Parfitt), 16:42
Side three
 "Roll Over Lay Down" (Rossi, Parfitt, Lancaster, John Coghlan, Young), 5:59
 "Big Fat Mama" (Rossi, Parfitt), 5:10
 "Caroline/Bye Bye Johnny" (with drum solo) (Rossi, Young/ Chuck Berry), 12:50
Side four
 "Rain" (Parfitt), 4:48
 "Don't Waste My Time" (Rossi, Young), 4:08
 "Roadhouse Blues" (Jim Morrison, John Densmore, Robby Krieger, Ray Manzarek), 14:12

Remastered CD track listing

Disc 1
 "Junior's Wailing" (White, Pugh)
 "Backwater/Just Take Me" (Parfitt, Lancaster)
 "Is There a Better Way" (Rossi, Lancaster)
 "In My Chair" (Rossi, Young)
 "Little Lady/Most of the Time" (Parfitt, Rossi, Young)
 "Rain" (Parfitt)
 "Forty-Five Hundred Times" (Rossi, Parfitt)

Disc 2
 "Roll Over Lay Down" (Rossi, Parfitt, Lancaster, Coghlan, Young)
 "Big Fat Mama" (Rossi, Parfitt)
 "Don't Waste My Time" (Rossi, Young)
 "Roadhouse Blues" (Morrison, Densmore, Krieger, Manzarek)
 "Caroline" (Rossi, Young)
 "Bye Bye Johnny" (Berry)

2014 box set disc 3: Tokyo Quo
 "Is There a Better Way" (Rossi, Lancaster)
 "Little Lady" (Parfitt)
 "Most of the Time" (Rossi, Young)
 "Rain" (Parfitt)
 "Caroline" (Rossi, Young)
 "Roll Over Lay Down" (Rossi, Parfitt, Lancaster, Coghlan, Young)
 "Big Fat Mama" (Rossi, Parfitt)
 "Don't Waste My Time" (Rossi, Young)
 "Bye Bye Johnny" (Berry)

Originally Japan-only live album, recorded at Sunplaza Hall 1976. First international CD release.

2014 box set disc 4: Australia '74
 "Junior's Wailing" (White, Pugh)
 "Backwater" (Parfitt, Lancaster)
 "Just Take Me" (Parfitt, Lancaster)
 "Claudie" (Rossi, Young)
 "Railroad" (Rossi, Young)
 "Roll Over Lay Down" (Rossi, Parfitt, Lancaster, Coghlan, Young)
 "Big Fat Mama" (Rossi, Parfitt)
 "Don't Waste My Time" (Rossi, Young)
 "Roadhouse Blues" Part 1 (Morrison, Densmore, Krieger, Manzarek)
 "Roadhouse Blues" Part 2 (Morrison, Densmore, Krieger, Manzarek)
 "Caroline" (Rossi, Young)
 "Drum Solo" (Coghlan)
 "Bye Bye Johnny" (Berry)

Soundboard recording from Quo tour. A part of Roadhouse Blues is missing.

Personnel
 Francis Rossi - guitar, vocals
 Rick Parfitt - guitar, vocals
 Alan Lancaster - bass, vocals
 John Coghlan - drums

Additional personnel
 Andy Bown - keyboards
 Bob Young - harmonica
 Jackie Lynton as MC, who introduced the band.

Charts

Weekly charts

Year-end charts

Certifications and sales

References

1977 live albums
Albums with cover art by Hipgnosis
Status Quo (band) live albums
Capitol Records live albums
Vertigo Records live albums